Attarsiya was a 15th–14th century BCE military leader of Ahhiya. In the Hittite archives of circa 1400 BCE, he is described as a "man of Ahhiya", a country identified with the Achaeans and Mycenaean Greece. The campaigns of Attarsiya, as well as his conflict with the Hittite vassal, Madduwatta, represent the first recorded Mycenaean Greek military activity on the Anatolian mainland, as well as the first conflict between Achaeans and Hittites. He finally withdrew from Anatolia after Hittite intervention, but later launched a campaign against Alashiya (Cyprus).

Contemporary Hittite accounts about the campaigns of Attarsiya and the Ahhiya in general may indicate that there was a possible Mycenaean empire centered on late Bronze Age Greece. Moreover, Attarsiya might be a possible Hittite reconstruction of the Greek name Atreus, a king of Mycenae according to Greek mythology.

Background
The activities of Attarsiya are recorded in the Hittite archives, in particular in the Indictment of Madduwata. He is described as a "man of Ahhiya", which was a typical Hittite way to refer to an enemy king. This makes Attarsiya the first known Achaean leader, but his exact authority inside the Achaean world remains unclear. The Hittite descriptions seem to agree that he was a local Achaean ruler in western Anatolia, rather than a High king of all the Achaeans.

Moreover, the chronology of the correspondent Hittite texts was initially estimated at the end of the 13th century BCE. However, more recent research, based on a number of archaic characteristics the specific texts feature, place it together with the events described circa two centuries earlier (end of 15th-beginning of 14th century BCE).

On the other hand, no relevant information is found in the contemporary Greek Linear B records. The latter, dealing only with administrative issues of the Mycenaean palaces, are of limited value concerning the political developments of the late Bronze Age era. Moreover, although the title of the Mycenaean kings, the wanax, has been read several times in the Linear B texts, no correspondent personal names have been found.

Military campaigns

Anatolia

The Hittite archives of circa 1400 BCE, during the reign of Arnuwanda I, describe the military campaign of Attarsiya in southwest Anatolia, probably in the region of Lycia. The Achaean expedition in Anatolia is associated with increased Mycenaean findings in Miletus during this period (early 14th century BCE), indicating that a number of Greek people moved from mainland Greece to this region.

Attarsiya probably used the city of Miletus, in west coast Anatolia, which was already under Achaean influence, as a military base. Attarsiya launched a campaign deploying an army that included 100 war chariots and attacked regions which were Hittite vassals, or at least under a certain degree of Hittite influence. Among them, he attacked the Hittite vassal, Madduwatta, likely a prince of the kingdom of Arzawa, and managed to expel him from his country. The latter found refuge in the court of the Hittite ruler and was installed by him as a vassal in Zipasla, somewhere in western Anatolia. Attarsiya launched a second attack against Madduwatta and managed again to defeat him. The Hittite vassal was unable to provide any opposition. As a result of Achaean military activity in the region, the Hittites dispatched an army under Kisnapli. The Indictment of Madduwatta gives a brief description of the battle:

The way the conflict is described, by counting only two casualties, may point that there was a duel between the nobles of the two sides. However, it is also possible that the dead among the common soldiers were not considered important to mention. Although the outcome of the battle remained unresolved, Attarsiya decided to withdraw his troops from the battlefield. After his retreat from the Anatolian mainland, Madduwatta was again installed as a Hittite vassal in the region.

Alashiya
Later, Attarsiya, still posing a threat to the Hittites, invaded the island of Alashiya (Cyprus) together with a number of his Anatolian allies, including his former enemy Madduwatta. The defection to the camp of Attarsiya no doubt worried the Hittites, since they sought to do trade with the Aegean island themselves. Nonetheless, Alashiya at that time was raided and possibly came under the control of Madduwatta, who may have become king of Arzawa in western Anatolia, or Ahhiyawa , hostile to Hattusa. The Mycenaean presence in Cyprus is also associated with archaeological evidence of Mycenaean Greek settlers, if not settlements, dating from that time unearthed there. Direct settlements were established probably in the late 13th century BCE, according to archaeological finds.

Legacy
The campaigns of Attarsiya represent the earliest recorded Mycenaean Greek military activity on the Anatolian mainland, as well as the first conflict between Achaeans and Hittites. It appears that these military developments had a certain impact on the local populations. In this context, a decorated shard of pottery from the Hittite capital, Hattusa, depicts a warrior with body armor and boar's tusk helmet, typical of Achaean warfare, while the Hittite king offers a Mycenaean type thrusting sword to the Storm God, Teshub.

Despite the withdrawal of Attarsiya after the Hittite intervention, the following decades (circa 1380-1320 BCE) were a period of Mycenaean expansion on the Anatolian coast. Achaean military activity in the region continues to be attested through several Hittite records until circa 1250 BCE.

Link with mythical Atreus
It has been suggested by several scholars that the term Attarsiya might be a possible Hittite reconstruction of the Greek name Atreus, a mythical king of Mycenae and father of Agamemnon. However, other scholars argue that even though the name is probably Greek, since he is described as an Ahhiya and connected to Atreus, the person carrying the name is not necessarily identical to the famous Atreus of Greek mythology. 

According to an alternative view presented by Hittitologist Albrecht Goetze, Attarsiya might possibly be a possessive adjective, meaning "belonging to Atreus" (Atreides), which was a typical Homeric term to refer to the sons of Atreus, Agamemnon and Menelaus, throughout the Iliad. British scholar Martin Litchfield West suggested that Atreus is a shorter form of an older Greek Bronze Αge era name, more closely connected with Attarsiya, like Atresias, Atersias or Atarsias.

A further possible link to the grecophone sphere is the Linear B term ta-ra-si-ja, well attested in Pylian tablet series JN, a word which means "copper/bronze allotment" or "weight unit of copper/bronze", or something similar, applied to metalworkers. In the Pylos JN 415 tablet, there is also found an adjective a-ta-ra-si-jo, meaning "without copper/bronze". The context in which ta-ra-si-ja occurs during the Late Helladic period suggests that those who produced or worked with the allocated raw materials were a large work force and the work was of a low-paid status. Worth noting at Pylos around 1200 BCE is the independence of a-ta-ra-si-jo smiths from allotments accorded ta-ra-si-ja smiths. It was evidently optional for anyone able to obtain sufficient quantities of copper or bronze from sources outside the palace to do so as an a-ta-ra-si-jo.

Possibility of a Mycenaean empire
It has been established in modern scholarship that the Hittite term Ahhiya (or Ahhiyawa in latter texts) refers to Mycenaean
Greek territory and its inhabitants, the Achaeans, one of the names that Homer used to refer to the Greeks in the Iliad. Historically important about the Achaeans in the time of Attarsiya is that they undertook an expedition to Anatolia, as well as Cyprus. The latter expedition indicates that the Achaean leader commanded a significant fleet and that the Achaeans were a sea power.

According to the Hittite inscriptions, it appears that the Ahhiya were a powerful empire, at the same scale as contemporary Egypt, Assyria and the Hittite Empire. Moreover, based on the fact that Attarsiya launched a military campaign in Anatolia and fielded one hundred chariots, in addition to infantry, Dutch researcher Jorrit Kelder suggested that Ahhiya must have had the military capacity of at least three times the size of the Mycenaean kingdom of Pylos, based on the information recorded on the Linear B tablets unearthed from the specific palace. Based on this view, the Achaeans under Attarsiya may have formed some kind of alliance which included several Mycenaean kingdoms.

References

Citations

Sources

 

 

Mycenaean Greeks
15th-century BC rulers
14th-century BC rulers
Ancient Anatolia
Greek military leaders